Zeta Sculptoris, Latinized from ζ Sculptoris, is a multiple star system in the constellation Sculptor. It is faintly visible to the naked eye with an apparent magnitude of 5.04. The annual parallax shift is 6.49 mas, which yields a distance estimate of about 500 light years from the Sun. It is moving further away with a radial velocity of +8.6 km/s. Zeta Sculptoris is near the Blanco 1 cluster as viewed from Earth, although parallax measurements indicate it to be substantially closer.

The primary component, designated Zeta Sculptoris A, is a single-lined, low amplitude spectroscopic binary system with an orbital period of 4.8 years and an eccentricity of 0.32. The visible member of this pair is a B-type main-sequence star with a stellar classification of B5 V. It has a 13th magnitude companion, Zeta Sculptoris B, at an angular separation of 3 arcseconds along a position angle of 330° (as of 1927). According to Eggleton and Tokovinin (2008), it is most likely gravitationally bound to the primary component.

References

B-type main-sequence stars
Binary stars
Sculptor (constellation)
Sculptoris, Zeta
CD-30 19790
224990
000183
9091